Uchhali is a saltwater lake in Soan Sakaser Valley in the southern Salt Range area in Pakistan. This lake is formed due to the absence of drainage in the range.

Due to its saline water the lake is lifeless but offers picturesque scenery. Boats are available.

See also
 Khabikki Lake
 Uchhali Complex

References

 

Lakes of Punjab (Pakistan)
Tourist attractions in Punjab, Pakistan
Khushab District